Edwards Stadium (also referred to as Edwards Field) is the track and field and soccer venue for the California Golden Bears, the athletic teams of the University of California, Berkeley.

This Art Deco-styled stadium was designed by architects Warren C. Perry and George W. Kelham, and opened in 1932.  It was named for mathematics professor George C. Edwards (18691930), who had been a member of the university's first graduating class, and was the oldest track-only stadium in the United States until 1999, when it was reconfigured to accommodate the Cal soccer teams. It is located at 2223 Fulton Street on the southwest corner of the Berkeley campus, at the corner of Bancroft Way, and has a seating capacity of 22,000. From the stadium there are panoramic views of the Berkeley Hills and Strawberry Canyon to the east, and the San Francisco Bay, Golden Gate Bridge, and the San Francisco skyline to the west.

An invitational Cal Bears track meet is held annually at Edwards Stadium.  It was renamed the Brutus Hamilton Memorial Invitational in 1998. The venue also hosted the NCAA Division I Men's Outdoor Track and Field Championships in 1935, 1937, 1952, 1956, 1958, 1960, 1965 and 1968. The venue has also has hosted a National AAU championship, and the 1971 and '78 USA vs. USSR dual meets, among others. There have been 12 world records (including records by Dutch Warmerdam, Jim Ryun, Pat Matzdorf, and Henry Rono), 26 American records and 24 collegiate records set at Edwards.

 the stadium was in need of both concrete repair and seismic upgrading.

See also
California Memorial Stadium

References

Art Deco architecture in California
College soccer venues in California
Sports venues in Berkeley, California
Sports venues in the San Francisco Bay Area
Athletics (track and field) venues in California
College track and field venues in the United States
California Golden Bears soccer
California Golden Bears track and field
University of California, Berkeley buildings
Event venues established in 1932
National Register of Historic Places in Berkeley, California
Sports venues on the National Register of Historic Places in California